Nut , also known by various other transcriptions, is the goddess of the sky, stars, cosmos, mothers, astronomy, and the universe in the ancient Egyptian religion. She was seen as a star-covered nude woman arching over the Earth, or as a cow. She was depicted wearing the water-pot sign (nw) that identifies her. Nut is comparable to the Mesopotamian goddess Ninhursag (the "lady of heaven") also sharing her role as mother of the gods.

Names 
The pronunciation of ancient Egyptian is uncertain because vowels were long omitted from its writing, although her name often includes the unpronounced determinative hieroglyph for "sky". Her name , itself also meaning "Sky", is usually transcribed as "Nut" but also sometimes appears in older sources as Nunut, Nent, and Nuit.

She also appears in the hieroglyphic record by a number of epithets, not all of which are understood.

Goddess of the sky 

Nut is a daughter of Shu and Tefnut. Her brother and husband is Geb. She had four childrenOsiris, Set, Isis, and Nephthysto which is added Horus in a Graeco-Egyptian version of the myth of Nut and Geb. She is considered one of the oldest deities among the Egyptian pantheon, with her origin being found on the creation story of Heliopolis. She was originally the goddess of the nighttime sky, but eventually became referred to as simply the sky goddess. Her headdress was the hieroglyph of part of her name, a pot, which may also symbolize the uterus. Mostly depicted in nude human form, Nut was also sometimes depicted in the form of a cow whose great body formed the sky and heavens, a sycamore tree, or as a giant sow, suckling many piglets (representing the stars).

Origins 

A sacred symbol of Nut was the ladder used by Osiris to enter her heavenly skies. This ladder-symbol was called maqet and was placed in tombs to protect the deceased, and to invoke the aid of the deity of the dead. Nut and her brother, Geb, may be considered enigmas in the world of mythology. In direct contrast to most other mythologies which usually develop a sky father associated with an Earth mother (or Mother Nature), she personified the sky and he the Earth.

Nut appears in the creation myth of Heliopolis which involves several goddesses who play important roles: Tefnut (Tefenet) is a personification of moisture, who mated with Shu (Air) and then gave birth to Sky as the goddess Nut, who mated with her brother Earth, as Geb. From the union of Geb and Nut came, among others, the most popular of Egyptian goddesses, Isis, the mother of Horus, whose story is central to that of her brother-husband, the resurrection god Osiris. Osiris is killed by his brother Set and scattered over the Earth in 14 pieces, which Isis gathers up and puts back together.

Myth of Nut and Ra 

Ra, the sun god, was the second to rule the world, according to the reign of the gods. He decreed, "Nut shall not give birth any day of the year." At that time, the year was only 360 days. Nut spoke to Thoth, god of wisdom, and he had a plan. Thoth gambled with Khonsu, god of the Moon, whose light rivaled that of Ra's. Every time Khonsu lost, he had to give Nut a piece of his moonlight. Khonsu lost so many times that Nut had enough moonlight to make five extra days. Since these days were not part of the year, Nut could have her children. She had five children on each of the five days: Osiris, later ruler of the gods and then god of the dead; Horus the Elder, god of war; Set, god of evil and the desert; Isis, goddess of magic; and Nephthys, goddess of water. When Ra found out, he was furious. He separated Nut from her husband Geb for eternity. Her father, Shu, was given the job to keep them apart. Nevertheless, Nut did not regret her decision.

Some of the titles of Nut were:
 Coverer of the Sky: Nut was the goddess of the visible sky which is why she's depicted on all fours arching her back upward in a "covering" position that encompasses the semi-sphere of the visible sky  as it can be observed from the perspective of the earth; and beneath her lies her brother Geb as the earth itself at her feet thus simulating the ground. As such she "covers" the rest of the sky which is not visible from the earth with her presence because of her role as the visible sky. During night time her body was believed to be covered in stars which were projected on her since she encompassed the earth covering it from the open sky, and as such the stars would touch her instead and become visible on her body.  
 She Who Protects: Among her jobs was to envelop and protect Ra, the sun god.
 Mistress of All or "She who Bore the Gods": Originally, Nut was said to be lying on top of Geb (Earth) and continually having intercourse. During this time she birthed four children: Osiris, Isis, Set, and Nephthys. A fifth child named Arueris is mentioned by Plutarch. He was the Egyptian counterpart to the Greek god Apollo, who was made syncretic with Horus in the Hellenistic era as 'Horus the Elder'. The Ptolemaic temple of Edfu is dedicated to Horus the Elder and there he is called the son of Nut and Geb, brother of Osiris, and the eldest son of Geb.
 She Who Holds a Thousand Souls: Because of her role in the re-birthing of Ra every morning and in her son Osiris' resurrection, Nut became a key goddess in many of the myths about the afterlife.

Role

Nut was the goddess of the sky and all heavenly bodies, a symbol of protecting the dead when they enter the afterlife. According to the Egyptians, during the day, the heavenly bodies—such as the Sun and Moon—would make their way across her body. Then, at dusk, they would be swallowed, pass through her belly during the night, and be reborn at dawn.

Nut is also the barrier separating the forces of chaos from the ordered cosmos in the world. She was pictured as a woman arched on her toes and fingertips over the Earth; her body portrayed as a star-filled sky. Nut's fingers and toes were believed to touch the four cardinal points or directions of north, south, east, and west.

Because of her role in saving Osiris, Nut was seen as a friend and protector of the dead, who appealed to her as a child appeals to its mother: "O my Mother Nut, stretch Yourself over me, that I may be placed among the imperishable stars which are in You, and that I may not die." Nut was thought to draw the dead into her star-filled sky, and refresh them with food and wine: "I am Nut, and I have come so that I may enfold and protect you from all things evil."

She was often painted on the inside lid of the sarcophagus, protecting the deceased. The vaults of tombs were often painted dark blue with many stars as a representation of Nut.
The Book of the Dead says, "Hail, thou Sycamore Tree of the Goddess Nut! Give me of the water and of the air which is in thee. I embrace that throne which is in Unu, and I keep guard over the Egg of Nekek-ur. It flourisheth, and I flourish; it liveth, and I live; it snuffeth the air, and I snuff the air, I the Osiris Ani, whose word is truth, in peace.''

Book of Nut 
The Book of Nut is a modern title of what was known in ancient times as The Fundamentals of the Course of the Stars. This is an important collection of ancient Egyptian astronomical texts, perhaps the earliest of several other such texts, going back at least to 2,000 BC. Nut, being the sky goddess, plays the primary role in the Book of Nut. The text also tells about various other sky and Earth deities, such as the star deities and the decans deities. The cycles of the stars and planets, as well as time keeping are also covered in the book.

References

Citations

Bibliography

Further reading

External links 
 
 

Egyptian goddesses
Sky and weather goddesses
Life-death-rebirth goddesses
Mother goddesses
Night goddesses
Stellar goddesses
Queens of Heaven (antiquity)
Personifications
Cattle deities